Dennis Jacobs (born November 8, 1937) was an American politician.

Born in Rock Island County, Illinois, Jacobs received his bachelor's degree in business administration and political science from Augustana College. From 1987 until 2005, Jacobs served in the Illinois State Senate and was a Democrat. He lives in East Moline, Illinois. Jacobs served on the East Moline City Council and on the Rock County Board. He also served as the county auditor. Jacobs also served as mayor of East Moline. His father Oral Jacobs served in the Illinois House of Representatives and his son Mike Jacobs also served in the Illinois Senate.

Notes

1937 births
Living people
People from Rock Island County, Illinois
Augustana College (Illinois) alumni
Democratic Party Illinois state senators
Mayors of places in Illinois
Illinois city council members
County board members in Illinois